Winterland is the third studio album by Sarah Dawn Finer, released on 3 November 2010.

The album has been described as a "winter's album", and consists of many Christmas songs.

Track listing
I'll Be Home for Christmas
Maybe This Christmas
Have Yourself a Merry Little Christmas
The Christmas Song
In the Bleak Midwinter
Christmas Time Is Here
Angel
Auld Lang Syne (Godnattvalsen)
I'll Be Your Wish Tonight
Winter Song
River
What a Wonderful World
Sometimes It Snows In April
Kärleksvisan (bonus track)

Charts

References 

2010 Christmas albums
Sarah Dawn Finer albums
Christmas albums by Swedish artists
Gospel Christmas albums